Laval Senior Academy (LSA) is an English-language senior high school in located in Laval, Québec. It is operated by the Sir Wilfrid Laurier School Board.

It was created on July 1, 2015, by the merger of Laval Liberty High School and Laurier Senior High School.

References

External links
 Laval Senior Academy

Schools in Laval, Quebec
High schools in Quebec
2015 establishments in Quebec
Educational institutions established in 2015